Henry Stephens may refer to:
Henry Stephens (agriculturalist) (1795–1874), Scottish farmer and writer
Henry Stephens (doctor) (1796–1864), British doctor, inventor and ink entrepreneur
Henry Stephens (Conservative politician) (1841–1918), ink manufacturer, philanthropist and British Member of Parliament for Hornsey & Finchley, 1887–1900
Henry Stephens (lumberman) (1823–1886), lumberman, merchant and financier in Michigan
Henry Douglas Stephens (1877–1952), Australian paediatric surgeon
Henry Louis Stephens (1824–1882), American illustrator
Henry Pottinger Stephens (1851–1903), English dramatist and journalist
Henry Robert Stephens (1665–1723), Belgian Jesuit theologian
Henri Estienne (1528–1598), also known as Henry Stephens, Parisian printer
H. Morse Stephens (1857–1919), historian

See also
Harry Stephens (disambiguation)
Henry Stevens (disambiguation)
Henry Stephen (disambiguation)